Halekulani has several uses including:

Halekulani, New South Wales
Halekulani hotel
Halekulani, a villain in Bobobo-bo Bo-bobo